Whitecaps FC 2 is a professional soccer team based in Vancouver, British Columbia, Canada that serves as the reserve team of the Vancouver Whitecaps FC of Major League Soccer.

History 

Prior to the MLS Next Pro iteration the team played its home games at UBC's Thunderbird Stadium and competed in the United Soccer League.

On November 17, 2017, the Whitecaps announced they were disbanding WFC2 and entering an affiliation agreement with USL expansion team Fresno FC.

On December 6, 2021, the Vancouver Whitecaps FC were named as one of 21 clubs that would field a team in the new MLS Next Pro league beginning in the 2022 season. The team plays at Swangard Stadium under the Whitecaps FC 2 name but will undergo a rebrand in 2023.

Players and staff

Roster

Head coaches
 Includes regular season and playoffs

Club captains

Year-by-year 
As of September 18, 2022

References 

 
Association football clubs established in 2014
2014 establishments in British Columbia
Former USL Championship teams
2017 disestablishments in British Columbia
Association football clubs established in 2021
2021 establishments in British Columbia
Canadian reserve soccer teams
Soccer clubs in British Columbia
MLS Next Pro teams
Expatriated football clubs